Chief of War is an upcoming American historical drama limited series created by Jason Momoa and Thomas Pa'a Sibbett for Apple TV+. Jason Momoa also stars and executive produces the series, which consists of nine episodes.

Premise
This epic adventure begins at turn of the 18th century when the four major kingdoms of Hawaii were in a state of war. Based on the true story of Ka'iana, a war chieftain who travels to the outside world and learns more about the men invading his island home. Knowing the separate kingdoms will eventually crumble under the weight of foreign interests, he returns home and joins a bloody campaign to unite the warring islands in order to save them from destruction,
The unification of Hawaii took place from 1782 to 1810 under King Kamehameha I, and Ka'iana (whom Momoa will portray) was called the "Prince of Kaua'i" and the "most famous Hawaiian in the world."

Cast

Main
 Jason Momoa as Kaiana
 Temuera Morrison as King Kahekili
 Luciane Buchanan as Kaahumanu
 Te Ao o Hinepehinga as Kaiana 
 Kaina Makua as Kamehameha
 Moses Goods as Moku
 Siua Ikaleo as Nahi
 Brandon Finn as Prince Kūpule
 James Udom as Tony
 Mainei Kinimaka as Heke
 Te Kohe Tuhaka as Namake
 Siaosi Fonua as Maui

Recurring
 Cliff Curtis as Keōua

Production 
It was announced in April 2022 that Apple TV+ had ordered the eight episode miniseries, with Jason Momoa set to star in and executive produce. Justin Chon was set to direct two episodes of the series that same month. Casting announcements in October and November revealed that Temuera Morrison, Luciane Buchanan, Te Ao o Hinepehinga, Kaina Makua, Moses Goods, Siua Ikaleo, Brandon Finn, James Udom, Mainei Kinimaka and Te Hoke Tuhaka had joined the cast. Cliff Curtis would join in a recurring role in February 2023.

Filming for the series began by October 2022 in New Zealand, with Bay of Islands being used to stand in for 18th century Hawaii.

References

External links 
 

Apple TV+ original programming
English-language television shows
Television series by Chernin Entertainment
Television shows filmed in New Zealand
Television shows set in Hawaii
Upcoming television series